Montana is an unincorporated community in Labette County, Kansas, United States.

History
A post office was established at Montana in 1866. Montana was laid out about 1868. The community was named after the Montana Territory.

Education
The community is served by Oswego USD 504 public school district.

References

Further reading

External links
 Labette County maps: Current, Historic, KDOT

Unincorporated communities in Labette County, Kansas
Unincorporated communities in Kansas